Shrimati "Smita" Uday Wagh is an Indian politician who is an elected member of the Maharashtra Legislative Council representing the Bharatiya Janata Party (BJP).

Wagh was the state BJP women president before being elected to the state legislature council in 2015.

References

Marathi politicians
Bharatiya Janata Party politicians from Maharashtra
Members of the Maharashtra Legislative Council
1958 births
Living people
People from Jalgaon district